The Kelmelis Hills are a group of hills rising to  between the Brodie Ponds and Joyce Glacier, situated midway up the Blue Glacier on its east margin, in Victoria Land, Antarctica. They were named in 1992 by Advisory Committee on Antarctic Names after John A. Kelmelis, a cartographer with the United States Geological Survey (USGS), and Manager of Polar Programs, Office of International Activities, USGS, 1984–87.

References

Hills of Victoria Land
Scott Coast